Pohnpei State Department of Education (PDOE) is an agency of Pohnpei State, Federated States of Micronesia that operates public schools. 

 Churchill B. Edward is the department's director.

Schools
 it had 31 elementary schools with 556 preschool students and 8,112 elementary students, and three high schools with 2,713 students.

High schools:
 Bailey Olter High School (formerly Pohnpei Island Central School) - Kolonia
 Madolenihmw High School - Madolenihmw
 Nanpei Memorial High School - Kitti

Elementary schools:
 Awak Elementary School - U
 Enipein School - Kitti
 ESDM Elementary School - Madolenihmw
 Kapingamarangi Elementary School - Kapingamarangi
 Kolonia Elementary School - Kolonia
 Lewetik Elementary School - Sokehs
 Lukop Elementary School - Madolenihmw
 Mand Elementary School - Madolenihmw
 Mwoakilloa Elementary School - Mwoakilloa
 Nanpei Memorial Elementary School - Kitti
 Nett Elementary School - Nett
 Nukuoro Elementary School - Nukuoro
 Ohmine Elementary School - Kolonia
 Pakein Elementary School - Sokehs
 Palikir Elementary School - Sokehs
 Parem Elementary School - Nett
 Pehleng Elementary School - Kitti
 Pingelap Elementary School - Pingelap
 Pohnlangas Elementary School - Madolenihmw
 Rohi Elementary School - Kitti
 RSP Elementary School - Sokehs
 Saladak Elementary School - U
 Salapwuk Elementary School - Kitti
 Sapwalap Elementary School - Madolenihmw
 Sapwuafik Elementary School - Sapwuafik
 Seinwar Elementary School - Kitti
 Sekere Elementary School - Sokehs
 Sokehs Powe Elementary School - Sokehs
 Temwen Elementary School - Madolenihmw
 Wapar Elementary School - Madolenihmw
 Wone Elementary School - Kitti

See also
 Education in the Federated States of Micronesia

References

External links
 Pohnpei State Department of Education
 
Education in the Federated States of Micronesia
Pohnpei